Aphrodite Pandemos ("common to all the people") occurs as an epithet of the Greek goddess Aphrodite. This epithet can be interpreted in different ways. In Plato's Symposium, Pausanias of Athens describes Aphrodite Pandemos as the goddess of sensual pleasures, in opposition to Aphrodite Urania, or "the heavenly Aphrodite". At Elis, she was represented as riding on a ram by Scopas. Another interpretation is that of Aphrodite uniting all the inhabitants of a country into one social or political body. In this respect she was worshipped at Athens along with Peitho (persuasion), and her worship was said to have been instituted by Theseus at the time when he united the scattered townships into one great body of citizens. According to some authorities, it was Solon who erected the sanctuary of Aphrodite Pandemos, either because her image stood in the agora, or because the hetairai had to pay the costs of its erection. The worship of Aphrodite Pandemos also occurs at Megalopolis in Arcadia, and at Thebes. A festival in honour of her is mentioned by Athenaeus. The sacrifices offered to her consisted of white goats. Pandemos occurs also as a surname of Eros. According to Harpocration, who quotes Apollodorus, Aphrodite Pandemos has very old origins, "the title Pandemos was given to the goddess established in the neighborhood of the Old Agora because all the Demos (people) gathered there of old in their assemblies which they called agorai." To honour Aphrodite's and Peitho's role in the unification of Attica, the Aphrodisia festival was organized annually on the fourth of the month of Hekatombaion (the fourth day of each month was the sacred day of Aphrodite). The Synoikia that honoured Athena, the protectress of Theseus and main patron of Athens, also took place in the month of Hekatombaion.

Christine Downing comments that, "Pausanias's description of the love associated with Aphrodite Pandemos as dedicated only to sensual pleasure and therefore directed indifferently to women and boys, and that associated with the Ouranian Aphrodite as “altogether male” and dedicated to the education of the soul of the beloved is actually an innovation—for Aphrodite Ourania was served in Corinth by prostitutes and Aphrodite Pandemos was the goddess as worshipped by the whole community."

The goddess riding on a goat was also known as Aphrodite Epitragia, "from a she-goat". According to Plutarch, she acquired this epithet from an episode in the life of Theseus when, by the recommendation of Apollo, the hero sacrificed a goat to Aphrodite before departing for Crete in hopes that she would guide him on his voyage. As Theseus sacrificed the customary she-goat, the animal was suddenly transformed into a male goat.

In Plato 
From the speech of Pausanias “[181b]...Now the Love that belongs to the Popular Aphrodite is in very truth [181b] popular and does his work at haphazard:  this is the Love we see in the meaner sort of men; who, in the first place, love women as well as boys; secondly, where they love, they are set on the body more than the soul; and thirdly, they choose the most witless people they can find, since they look merely to the accomplishment and care not if the manner be noble or no.  Hence they find themselves doing everything at haphazard, good or its opposite, without distinction: [181c] for this Love proceeds from the goddess who is far the younger of the two, and who in her origin partakes of both female and male.  But the other Love springs from the Heavenly goddess who, firstly, partakes not of the female but only of the male; and secondly, is the elder, untinged with wantonness:  wherefore those who are inspired by this Love betake them to the male, in fondness for what has the robuster nature and a larger share of mind. Even in the passion for boys you may note the way of those who are under the single incitement of this Love: [181d] they love boys only when they begin to acquire some mind—a growth associated with that of down on their chins. For I conceive that those who begin to love them at this age are prepared to be always with them and share all with them as long as life shall last:  they will not take advantage of a boy's green thoughtlessness to deceive him and make a mock of him by running straight off to another. Against this love of boys a law should have been enacted, [181e] to prevent the sad waste of attentions paid to an object so uncertain:  for who can tell where a boy will end at last, vicious or virtuous in body and soul?  Good men, however, voluntarily make this law for themselves, and it is a rule which those ‘popular’ lovers ought to be forced to obey, [182a] just as we force them, so far as we can, to refrain from loving our freeborn women.  These are the persons responsible for the scandal which prompts some to say it is a shame to gratify one's lover:  such are the cases they have in view, for they observe all their reckless and wrongful doings; and surely, whatsoever is done in an orderly and lawful manner can never justly bring reproach." Plato's Symposium. 

See also 183d, 185c, 187e.

Notes

References

Pandemos